Caleb Hanna (born October 29, 1999) is an American politician as a Republican member of the West Virginia House of Delegates, representing District 44. Hanna was elected to the office on November 6, 2018, defeating Dana Lynch. Caleb Hanna lives in Nicholas County, West Virginia.

Career 
Hanna was first elected to public office in 2018 at 19 years old and was the youngest African-American ever elected to a state office. He attended West Virginia State University as a full-time student and earned his B.A. in economics.

Hanna serves as the Assistant Majority Whip, Chair of the Select Committee on Minority Issues and the Vice Chair of a Select Committee on Prevention and Treatment of Substance Abuse, and a member of the Education, Senior, Children, and Family Issues committee.

Electoral history

References

1999 births
Living people
Republican Party members of the West Virginia House of Delegates
African-American state legislators in West Virginia
21st-century American politicians
21st-century African-American politicians